Civray may refer to the following places in France:

Civray, Cher, a commune in the department of Cher
Civray, Vienne, a commune in the department of Vienne
Civray-de-Touraine, a commune in the department of Indre-et-Loire
Civray-sur-Esves, a commune in the department of Indre-et-Loire